Idinjamala is a village situated in Udambanchola Taluk of Idukki District, which is a part of the Western Ghats of the Southern Peninsula in India.

Idinjamala is 1200 meters above sea level and rich with natural vegetation. Farming is the main occupation here; the soil is alluvial soil, suitable for plantation crops like tea, coffee, cardamom, pepper and other spices which are cultivated in plenty.

The nearest railway station is Kottayam which is 121 km away and Cochin International Airport is 110 km away.

Even though there is no clear evidence whether men of the Paleolithic age lived here, there is evidence of stone-age civilization. Stone-age dolmens were discovered during archaeological excavation at Kallar Pattam colony near Idinjamala.

Idinjamala is also home to the International Sustainable Academy (ISA), a sustainability initiative run by the MASS Fairtrade farmers’ co-operative.

Places of interest include Idukki Arch Dam, Hill View Park, the Periyar Wildlife Sanctuary, and the International Sustainable Academy.

References 

Villages in Idukki district